Huang Tsung-hsing (also known as Huang Chung-hsin; May 27, 1920 – October 28, 1976) was a Chinese Hong Kong actor. He appeared in two films with superstar Bruce Lee such as Fist of Fury as Cook Tien and The Way of The Dragon as Uncle Wang. Huang married actress Lisa Chiao Chiao. Huang also acted with fighting instructor Han Ying-chieh in Fist of Fury. Huang also acted in 70 other movies, many of them about martial arts.

Early life
Huang was born on May 27, 1920 in Hebei, China.

Marriage and death 
He was married once to Taiwanese actress Lisa Chiao Chiao in 1963 and had a son, but they separated a few years later. In 1966 Huang got into a car accident and Chiao moved to Hong Kong to look after him.  On October 28, 1976, while riding his motorbike in Taiwan, he got into a second car accident and died from his injuries. He was 56 years old.

Partial filmography 

1951: E meng chu xing - Reporter
1955: Mei gang chun hui
1956: Guan shan xing
1958: Feng liu yuan jia
1958: Chang feng wan li
1959: Pen huo nu lang - Fang Donghai
1959: Mo ter zhi lian
1960: Dao guang jian ying
1960: Cui gang yu xie ji
1962: Yi shi yi jia
1963: Ama no kaishinju
1963: You xia yi quan - Hei Tien Lung
1963: Hei ye dao li ming
1965: Song of Orchid Island - Witch doctor Barda
1966: Downhill They Ride
1966: Du mei gui - Li San
1967: Die wang jiao wa - Hung Ying
1967: The King with My Face - Wen Tsu-yuan
1967: One-Armed Swordsman - Wei Hsuan
1967: Ru xia - Yin Shih-yuan
1967: Summons to Death
1967: Qi xia wu yi - Hsu Ching
1967: The Assassin - Premier Han Kuei
1968: Guai xia - Chiang Tan Feng
1968: Yu mian fei hu
1968: The Sword of Swords - Shang Kwan-wu
1968: Yun ni - Dr. Chiu Tung-Wang
1968: Divorce, Hong Kong Style
1968: Bayangan ajal
1969: Dragon Swamp
1969: Yan niang - Li Fei-lung, Escort Service Chief
1969: The Golden Sword - Steward Peng (after)
1970: Shi er jin pai - Lei Ting
1970: Sha ji
1970: Lady of Steel - Han Shixiong aka Cai Yi
1970: Jiang hu san nu xia - Chung Pa-tien
1970: Wu lin feng yun - Fierce Tiger
1970: Tie luo han - Hsiao Tien Tsun
1970: Love Without End - Sun Jing-sheng
1971: Gui tai jian
1971: Jin yin chou
1971: Nu sha shou
1971: Vengeance of a Snowgirl - Ko Hung
1971: Lei ru fung - Li Yuen-wei
1972: Lin Chong ye ben
1972: The Chinese Connection - Tien
1972: Wu hu cui hua
1972: Way of the Dragon - 'Uncle' Wang (as Wang Chung Hsin)
1972: The 14 Amazons - Meng Huai Yuan, Yang's General (as Huang Chung Hsing)
1972: Bronze Head and Steel Arm
1972: Da nei gao shou
1972: Qing bian
1973: Back Alley Princess
1973: Chinese Hercules - Uncle Lo (as Chung Tsung Wang)
1973: Dragons of Death
1973: Inspector Karate
1973: Meng han - Master Luk Kai
1974: The Mandarin Magician
1974: E hu cun
1976: The Eternal Obsession - (final film role)

External links
 Hong Kong Cinemagic

20th-century Hong Kong male actors
20th-century Chinese male actors
Male actors from Hebei
Chinese male film actors
1929 births
1976 deaths
Hong Kong male film actors